The Pendragon Campaign  is an Arthurian tabletop role-playing supplement, written by Greg Stafford, with art by Tom Sullivan, and published by Chaosium in 1985. This was the first product for the award-winning Pendragon game, an eighty-year campaign across Arthurian history.

Publication history
Original published in 1985, it was republished in 2018 in PDF format. It was completely revised as The Boy King in 1991 and 1997, then further revised as The Great Pendragon Campaign in 2006.

Contents
The Pendragon Campaign details King Arthur's Britain and surrounding lands, as well as the major characters of the Pendragon setting and an expanded timeline.

Reception
Graham Staplehurst reviewed The Pendragon Campaign for White Dwarf #74, giving it an overall rating of 9 out of 10, and stated that "The TPC on the whole is a very good production, and an essential addition to Pendragon."

Steven A. List reviewed The Pendragon Campaign in Space Gamer/Fantasy Gamer No. 77. List commented that "It is not essential to playing KAP or even running a KAP campaign, but it is extremely useful in that regard and is in itself entertaining and informative reading for those with more than a passing interest in the Arthur of history, literature and legend."

The Pendragon Campaign won the H.G. Wells Award for Best Roleplaying Supplement of 1985.

The Great Pendragon Campaign won the Diana Jones Award - a major juried award "for excellence in gaming" - in 2007.

Reviews
Different Worlds #42 (May/June, 1986)
Polyhedron #32 (1986)
White Wolf #7 (Apr 1987)

References

Fantasy role-playing game supplements
Pendragon (role-playing game)
Role-playing game supplements introduced in 1985